Yongchang Town is the new county seat of Beichuan Qiang Autonomous County in Mianyang, Sichuan, China, one of the worst-hit areas in the 2008 Sichuan earthquake. It is named after the two towns as "Yongchang Town", which means "eternal prosperity" in Chinese. Construction will be carried out here, including housing, schools, government buildings and hospitals.

References

2008 Sichuan earthquake
Towns in Sichuan
Beichuan Qiang Autonomous County
Cities destroyed by earthquakes